Padavettu is a 2022 Indian Malayalam-language political action thriller film written and directed by Liju Krishna. It was produced by Yoodlee Films in association with Sunny Wayne Productions. The film starring Nivin Pauly, Aditi Balan and Shammi Thilakan depicts the story of the oppressed section of society in northern Kerala.

The film was released theatrically on 21 October 2022.

Plot
Ravi is a jobless guy living with his aunt Pushpa. He just sits at home all day and fights with everyone including his aunt and neighbors. His house is in a bad shape now since they do not have money to repair it. They have given an application in the Panchayat for money to repair it. Despite Pushpa always complaining in the Panchayat meetings, they don't seem interested to consider her request.

A local politician named Kuyyali hears this and sees it as an opportunity. He rebuilds their house for them without their permission and keeps a plaque infront of their home advertising his party. Everyone who passes by in front of their home starts noticing it and that irks Ravi and so he breaks it at night. When Kuyyali hears about it, he tries to take advantage of the situation and accuses the opposition party of the wrong doing. Ravi tells the police that it was he who does that. Kuyyali rebuilds the plaque and threatens Ravi that if he breaks it again, it will be bad for Ravi.

Ravi's neighbor Mohanan's dad gets killed by a wild boar one night when he was supervising his field. To take revenge, Mohanan goes to the field the next night to kill the boar but boar attacks him and he gets injured. Ravi turns up at the scene and kills the Boar instead.

Ravi decides not be lazy in life anymore and starts farming at his home. Meanwhile, Kuyyali through his shoddy schemes tries to take control of all farmer lands. Ravi objects. In revenge, Kuyyali decides that the end location for his election rally will be Ravi's home and they will destroy the home and farm land. Ravi starts destroying the plaque they kept at his home. The party workers starts to fight with Ravi. Ravi wins and then tells Kuyyali never to step on his home again. Ravi proclaims that the farm land belongs to the farmers.

Cast
 Nivin Pauly as Ravi 
 Aditi Balan as Shyma
 Shammi Thilakan as Kuyyali
 Shine Tom Chacko as Mohanan
 Remya Suresh as Pushpa
 Manoj Omen as Manoj
 Vijayaraghavan as Coach Yohannan
 Indrans as Raghavan Mash
 Sudheesh as Govindhan
 Kainakary Thankaraj as President Vijayan
 Subeesh Sudhi as Sasi
 Sunny Wayne as Shyma's Ex-husband (Cameo)

Production
The film was shot at Maloor in Kannur, which is the native village of Liju Krishna. Around a thousand people from the village were trained through crash course in acting for the film.

Principal photography began in December 2019 in Kannur district. First schedule was wrapped in February 2020. Second schedule was delayed due to the COVID-19 pandemic in India. It was wrapped up on 15 March 2022 in Kannur.

Release
The first trailer was released on 7 October 2022 at Jawaharlal Nehru Stadium, Kochi in front of Manjappada before the opening game of the 2022–23 Indian Super League season between Kerala Blasters and East Bengal. The film was released theatrically on 21 October 2022.

Critical reception
Anna M. M. Vetticad of Firstpost praised the cinematography and score but found that the film lacked cohesion: “Great camerawork and music require scripts on which to pin themselves. Sadly, the writing of Padavettu is too defused to serve this purpose." Rating the film 2.5 out of 5 stars, Vetticad wrote, "The first half is solid, but leads into a second half clouded by mixed metaphors and hazy philosophising…”

References

External links
 

Films postponed due to the COVID-19 pandemic
2020s Malayalam-language films
2022 films
2022 drama films
Films scored by Govind Vasantha
Indian political drama films
2022 directorial debut films